Jassidophaga is a genus of flies belonging to the family Pipunculidae.

Species
Jassidophaga abscissa (Thomson, 1869)
Jassidophaga argentisegmentata (Brunetti, 1912)
Jassidophaga armata (Thomson, 1869)
Jassidophaga beatricis (Coe, 1966)
Jassidophaga chiiensis (Ôuchi, 1943)
Jassidophaga contracta Yang & Xu, 1998
Jassidophaga eximia (Kuznetzov, 1993)
Jassidophaga fasciata (Roser, 1840)
Jassidophaga flavidipes De Meyer & Grootaert, 1992
Jassidophaga guangxiensis Yang & Xu, 1998
Jassidophaga hodosa (Kuznetzov, 1993)
Jassidophaga japonica (Morakote, 1990)
Jassidophaga kurilensis (Kuznetzov, 1993)
Jassidophaga makarkini (Kuznetzov, 1993)
Jassidophaga nearctica Kehlmaier, 2006
Jassidophaga pala (Morakote, 1990)
Jassidophaga pilosa (Zetterstedt, 1838)
Jassidophaga plumbella (Brunetti, 1912)
Jassidophaga pollinosa (Kuznetzov, 1993)
Jassidophaga sidorenkoi (Kuznetzov, 1993)
Jassidophaga speciosa (Kuznetzov, 1993)
Jassidophaga verrucosa (Kuznetzov, 1993)
Jassidophaga villosa (Roser, 1840)

References

Pipunculidae
Brachycera genera
Diptera of Europe
Diptera of Asia
Diptera of Australasia
Diptera of North America